The  (PIT-CNT) is a national trade union center in Uruguay. Ten years later, in 1983, activities resumed under the name  (PIT), which was then also banned after a general strike in 1984. The union was then restored under the present name in March of 1985.

See also

 Trade unions in Uruguay

References

External links

 PIT-CNT

Trade unions in Uruguay
Trade unions established in 1964